Cossurida is an order of polychaetes belonging to the class Polychaeta. The order is monotypic, consisting of only one family: Cossuridae Day, 1963

References

Polychaetes
Annelid families